The Klumpke-Roberts Award, one of seven international and national awards for service to astronomy and astronomy education given by the Astronomical Society of the Pacific, was established from a bequest by astronomer Dorothea Klumpke-Roberts to honor her husband Isaac Roberts and her parents. 

It recognizes outstanding contributions to the public understanding and appreciation of astronomy.  It is open to "individuals involved in science, education, writing/publishing, broadcasting, astronomy popularization, the arts, or other pursuits" from all nations and is the most prestigious award of its kind.

Award winners 
Source: Astronomical Society of the Pacific

See also

 List of astronomy awards

References

Astronomy prizes
Awards established in 1974